Dennis Raphael is a professor of Health Policy and Management at York University in Toronto. Raphael received his Ph.D. from the University of Toronto in 1975.

Most of his over 300 scientific publications have focused on the health effects of income inequality and poverty, the quality of life of communities and individuals, and the impact of government decisions on Canadians' health and well-being. Over the course of his career he has published 16 books, 67 book chapters, and 160 refereed journal articles. Raphael has recently published on the affinities between the social determinants of health and the social determinants of oral health, health discourses among disease associations, and concepts of legitimacy and competency of governing authorities in liberal welfare states. He also has had articles published concerning health inequalities in the Republic of Rwanda and the Nordic nations. He previously published two articles on the health of Nordic nations in the Scandinavian Journal of Public Health. Raphael's extensive contributions to the field were recognized by his being promoted to full professor and being the recipient of the 2009–2010 York University Faculty of Health Dean's Award in the Research — Established Career Category. Since 2004, he has managed the Social Determinants of Health Listserve at York University.

Most recently, he updated Staying Alive: Critical Perspectives on Health, Illness, and Health Care (third edition, 2019) with Toba Bryant and Marcia Rioux and, with Toba Bryant, prepared the volume The Politics of Health in the Canadian Welfare State (published in 2020). In June 2019 he gave a keynote address at the 9th Nordic Health Promotion Research Conference in Roskilde, Denmark. He has updated Poverty in Canada: Implications for Health and Quality of Life (third edition published in 2020). With Toba Bryant, Juha Mikkonen and Alexander Raphael he prepared the second edition of Social Determinants of Health: The Canadian Facts which is available at http://thecanadianfacts.org  The first version was downloaded 1,200,000 times and helped shift the discourse on health and its determinants in Canada.

Selected publications
The politics of health in the Canadian welfare state (with Toba Bryant).  https://www.canadianscholars.ca/books/the-politics-of-health-in-the-canadian-welfare-state] 2020. 
Social determinants of health: The Canadian facts (with Toba Bryant, Juha Mikkonen and Alexander Raphael). 2nd edition, http://thecanadianfacts.org] 2020. 
Poverty in Canada: Implications for health and quality of life. 3rd edition, Canadian Scholars’ Press, 2020. 
Staying alive: Critical perspectives on health, illness, and health care (with Toba Bryant and Marcia Rioux). 3rd edition, Canadian Scholars’ Press, 2019. 
Immigration, public policy, and health: Newcomer experiences in developed nations. Canadian Scholars’ Press , 2016.  
Social determinants of health: Canadian perspectives. 3rd edition, Canadian Scholars’ Press , 2016. 
Tackling health inequalities: Lessons from International experiences. Canadian Scholars’ Press.CSPI. 2012. 
About Canada: Health and illness, 2nd edition , 2010. Fernwood Publishers. 
Health promotion and quality of life in Canada: Essential readings. Canadian Scholars’ Press, 2010. 
Reducing Social and Health Inequalities Requires Building Social and Political Movements; Humanity & Society , Vol 33, Issue 1-2, pp. 145–165; February 1, 2009; doi:10.1177/016059760903300109

References

External links
 Dennis Raphael's Homepage
 Social Determinants of Health Listserv at York University
 Social Determinants of Health: The Canadian Facts

Living people
Canadian sociologists
Medical sociologists
People in public health
Academic staff of York University
University of Toronto alumni
Year of birth missing (living people)